Sarah Killion Woldmoe (born Sarah Christine Killion; July 27, 1992) is an American former professional soccer player who played as a midfielder.

Early life
Born and raised in Fort Wayne, Indiana, Woldmoe attended Bishop Dwenger High School where she played on the varsity soccer team for four years. Woldmoe was named Gatorade Player of the Year for the state of Indiana three times from 2009 to 2011. In 2010, she was named an ESPN RISE All-American and NSCAA Youth All-American; the latter for the second consecutive year. She was named NSCAA High School All-American in 2009 and 2010. Top Drawer Soccer rated her as the number 9 recruit in the country and top recruit from the state of Indiana. She finished her high school career with 63 goals and 73 assists. Woldmoe also played club soccer for the Fort Wayne Fever.

UCLA Bruins

Woldmoe chose to attend the University of California, Los Angeles (UCLA) and appeared in all 21 games for them her freshman season, starting in 11 of them. She assisted 2 goals, both to senior forward Sydney Leroux.

In 17 games (all starts) as a sophomore, Woldmoe recorded 6 assists and scored 3 goals of her own, two of which were game winners (vs. Oregon State and Colorado). She earned a selection to the All-Pac-12 team, as well as to the NSCAA All-Pacific Region first team and the Top Drawer Soccer National Team of the Season second team. Woldmoe also was named as an honorable mention on the Pac-12 All-Academic team.

Continuing a solid sophomore campaign, Woldmoe took off as a junior, scoring 1 goal and leading the Pac-12 in assists (12) while helping lead her team to the national championship game, where they defeated Florida State 1–0 in overtime to win their first ever NCAA Tournament championship. A starter in 25 out of the 26 games she played in, Woldmoe earned numerous awards and accolades, including selections to the All-Pac-12 team, College Cup All-Tournament team, Top Drawer Soccer Best XI, and NSCAA All-Pacific Region team. The LA Soccer News Player of the Year was also recognized on the Pac-12 All-Academic team, as well as on the NSCAA Scholar All-American and All-West Region teams and the Capital One Academic All-District second team.

The best individual season for Woldmoe came in 2014 as a senior. Accounting for 30 total points (at least 16 more than she recorded in any of her previous 3 seasons) in 24 games (all starts), Woldmoe finished her college career off with a 9-goal, 12-assist season, helping to lead her team to another College Cup. After being selected to the MAC Hermann Trophy Watch List, she made the Top Drawer Soccer Team of the Week three times and was named as the MVP of the Outrigger Resorts Soccer Classic after 1-goal/2-assist and 1-goal games against Hawaii and Pepperdine. She also set the UCLA record for assists in a game (3) against Loyola Marymount on September 21. For her senior-season performance, Woldmoe made the All-Pac 12 team, Top Drawer Soccer Best XI, NSCAA All-Pacific Region first team, and NSCAA All-American third team. Once again, Woldmoe was also honored greatly for her academic achievements, being named the Pac-12 Scholar of the Year and a Senior CLASS Award finalist and being selected to the Pac-12 All-Academic second team, NSCAA Scholar All-American and All-West Region first team, and Capital One Academic All-District second-team.

Club career

Sky Blue FC, 2015–2020
Woldmoe was selected second in the 2015 NWSL College Draft by Sky Blue FC. She made her debut for the club during the team's first match of the season against Houston Dash on April 19, 2015.

Adelaide United FC, 2015–2016
Woldmoe joined Adelaide United from the Australian W-League for the 2015–16 season.

Chicago Red Stars, 2021–2022
On December 29, 2020, it was announced that Woldmoe, along with teammate Mallory Pugh, would be traded to the Chicago Red Stars in exchange for three total first-round picks and an international slot for the 2021 and 2022 NWSL seasons.

She retired from soccer in December 2022.

International career
Woldmoe has represented the United States at various youth levels. She was a starting player for United States under-20 women's national soccer team that won the FIFA U-20 Women's World Cup in 2012. She played for the United States under-23 national team at the 2013 Four Nations Tournament.

In February 2014, Woldmoe was named to the senior team roster by head coach Tom Sermanni for the 2014 Algarve Cup. Woldmoe received a call-up from coach Jill Ellis for January camp in 2017, she has not yet received a senior team cap.

Personal life 
She married her husband, Austin, in November 2019.

Woldmoe began using her married name in 2020.

It was announced on February 28, 2022, that she and her husband were expecting their first child. She gave birth to their son in August 2022.

Career statistics

Honors

Team
Winner
 FIFA U-20 Women's World Cup: 2012
 CONCACAF Women's U-20 Championship: 2012
 2013 NCAA College Cup

Individual

Club
 2017 NWSL Team of the Month (May)
 2021 NWSL Player of the Week (Week 15)

References

External links 

 
 UCLA player profile
 Chicago Red Stars player profile 

1992 births
Living people
American women's soccer players
UCLA Bruins women's soccer players
NJ/NY Gotham FC players
Adelaide United FC (A-League Women) players
National Women's Soccer League players
A-League Women players
Soccer players from Indiana
Women's association football midfielders
Sportspeople from Fort Wayne, Indiana
NJ/NY Gotham FC draft picks
United States women's under-20 international soccer players
Chicago Red Stars players
American expatriate sportspeople in Australia
Expatriate women's soccer players in Australia
American expatriate women's soccer players
Fort Wayne Fever (W-League) players